Viterzhevo is a rural locality (a village) in Yugskoye Rural Settlement, Cherepovetsky District, Vologda Oblast, Russia. The population was 20 as of 2002.

Geography 
Viterzhevo is located 35 km southeast of Cherepovets (the district's administrative centre) by road. Chernevo is the nearest rural locality.

References 

Rural localities in Cherepovetsky District